Stemphleytown is an unincorporated community located in Rockingham County, in the U.S. state of Virginia.

Geography 
It is located two miles west of Dayton, along Virginia State Route 257.

References

Unincorporated communities in Rockingham County, Virginia
Unincorporated communities in Virginia